Philodromus johani is a spider species found in Greece.

See also 
 List of Philodromidae species

References

External links 

johani
Spiders of Europe
Fauna of Greece
Spiders described in 2009